A coal haul truck may refer to:
 Dumper
 Dump truck
 Haul truck
 Mineral wagon

See also 
 Coal truck (disambiguation)